Cult Fiction is the third studio album by Virginia-based metalcore band Spitfire. It is the follow up to the band's 2006 album Self-Help. The title of the album seems to be a reference to a previous work by Jon Spencer's first band, Scarlet, titled "Cult Classic".

Writing and recording
Spitfire had this to say about the writing process: "We are writing what is turning out to be the darkest, heaviest, and most diverse record any of us have ever written. Our approach to this record is to saturate it with more emotion than we ever have put into our music before."

Release and distribution
Cult Fiction was released in the US on April 29, 2008 by hardcore indie label Goodfellow Records. The album was released in both digital download and digipak CD format.

Reception
The album has been generally well received by critics. Joshua of Maelstrom lauded the visceral nature of the album, claiming "Cult Fiction rips all sorts of new orifices in the most uncomfortably delicious of ways". Complimenting the track Apnea 1 (Segue 1) Sasha Horn of Metal Review states "If I had three minutes and thirteen seconds left until the end of the world by tsunami, I'd take my ghetto-blaster with me to the end of a pier, turn this up on ten, close my eyes, and let the waves separate me". The album artwork and packaging has also received considerable attention: "the performances, songs, and even the CD’s packaging-about Cult Fiction indicates it’s a first-class effort" states Zak Brown of Blistering.com, noting "The album’s artwork is truly part of the listening experience...".

Legacy
Was born. Started cult. Fulfilled prophecy. Died with dignity.

Track listing

Personnel
 Matt Beck - guitar
 Chris Raines - drums
 Jon Spencer - vocals
 Dan Tulloh - guitar

References

2008 albums
Spitfire (American band) albums